Koskandawala Sri Sunandarama Piriven Raja Maha Vihara (Sinhalaː කොස්කඳවල ශ්‍රී සුනන්දාරාම පිරිවෙන් රජ මහා විහාරය) is an old Buddhist temple in Koskandawala, Sri Lanka. The temple is located on Yakkala – Radawana road approximately 2.66 km (1.66 mi) away from Yakkala town. The temple has been formally recognized by the Government as an archaeological site in Sri Lanka.

See also
 List of Archaeological Protected Monuments in Sri Lanka

References

Buddhist temples in Gampaha District
Buddhist caves in Sri Lanka
Archaeological protected monuments in Gampaha District